Filip Pajović (born 30 July 1993) is a Serbian football goalkeeper who plays for Újpest FC.

Club statistics

Updated to games played as of 27 June 2020.

Honours
Videoton
Ligakupa: 2012
Nemzeti Bajnokság I: 2014–15

References

External links
 
 Filip Pajović stats at utakmica.rs 
 

1993 births
Living people
Sportspeople from Zrenjanin
Association football goalkeepers
Serbian footballers
Serbia youth international footballers
FK Vojvodina players
FK Čukarički players
Serbian SuperLiga players
Serbian expatriate footballers
Serbian expatriate sportspeople in Hungary
Expatriate footballers in Hungary
Fehérvár FC players
Puskás Akadémia FC players
Újpest FC players
Nemzeti Bajnokság I players